I Was a Teenage Exocolonist is a 2022 role-playing video game developed by Northway Games and published by Finji. The player starts the game as a ten year old, going through events that affect the colony until the game ends when they turn twenty. The game released on Microsoft Windows, macOS, Linux, Nintendo Switch, PlayStation 4 and PlayStation 5 in August 2022.

Gameplay 
When the player starts Exocolonist, they can customize their character, picking traits that affect the rest of the game alongside choosing a childhood friend. The game takes place in years, with players having to choose an activity to do each month. These can include learning about the military or traveling to places other than the main hub. Players engage in a card mini-game that determines stat increases during each of these activities. The player acquires cards through events, each of which is a "memory" with a unique skill bonus associated with it. These stat increases open up new options or make it easier to win the card game.

Outside of that, players can make decisions that determine if characters live or die depending on the activity they chose. The player can build friendships with other colonists by giving them gifts or doing activities with them, which opens up the possibly for romance. At the end of the character's twentieth year, the game comes to a close. While replaying the game, the player can make new choices using knowledge gained from prior playthroughs.

Plot 
After events on earth led it to be difficult to inhabit, a group of colonists built a ship and set course to a wormhole to take them to Vertumna IV. The player starts on the Stratospheric, which soon after reaches the wormhole. The player grows dizzy and falls into a coma.

When they awake, the ship has been disassembled into a colony with different departments for the player to learn and gain skills from. 

Midway through the game, the colony is nearly destroyed by an alien, and a new militaristic group from earth arrives to take control. Towards the end of the game, the player has the option of outing the military leader and stopping the takeover of Vertumna by other colonizers, or letting them remain.

Development 
The game started development in 2017. A developer noted that an important part of the early years was making sure "the characters feel natural, and giving you gameplay hooks to hold on to while interacting with them". The game's focus around giving the player impactful decisions to make was enabled by "thousands of conditional statements" to ensure that it could adapt. Exocolonist's story consists of eight hundred events that can be triggered on and off depending if the player has met certain requirements. The early game deaths were presented without much foreshadowing and drama to capture how a ten-year old experiences loss. The game's dialogue system was built in a custom scripting system known as Exoscript. The game uses a mix of 3D objects and 2D billboards that face the camera to give depth to scenes.

Reception 

I Was a Teenage Exocolonist received "generally favorable reviews" to "universal acclaim" according to review aggregator, Metacritic.

Destructoid liked the memories system, saying it worked both as a gameplay mechanic, "but also mimics how our memories work in real life quite beautifully". Nintendo Life enjoyed the art style, but criticized how the story lacked consequences, "Apparent jeopardy is usually overcome straightforwardly, and when our choices did seem to have gone badly wrong, the consequences just evaporated". Polygon praised the game's approach to gender, liking how "your character’s gender expression can be changed at any point in the game, and it doesn’t affect who you can romance".

Accolades

References 

2022 video games
Finji games
Linux games
MacOS games
Northway Games games
PlayStation 4 games
PlayStation 5 games
Simulation video games
Single-platform video games
Single-player video games
Video games developed in Canada
Video games with isometric graphics
Visual novels
Windows games